"Yuruginaimono Hitotsu" is the forty-first single by B'z, released on April 12, 2006.  This song is one of B'z many number-one singles in Oricon charts. The B-side "Pierrot" was also featured on the album Monster and it has been covered by Aya Kamiki. The song is used as the ending theme in Detective Conans tenth feature film Detective Conan: The Private Eyes' Requiem.

Track listing 
 - 4:37
 - 3:13

Certifications

References 
 B'z performance at Oricon

External links 
 B'z official website

2006 singles
2006 songs
B'z songs
Case Closed songs
Japanese film songs
Songs written for animated films
Oricon Weekly number-one singles
Songs written by Tak Matsumoto
Songs written by Koshi Inaba